Adhemar Grijó Filho (18 October 1931 – 23 August 2020) was a Brazilian athlete who competed in three Olympics. He represented Brazil in swimming at the 1952 Olympics and in water polo at the 1960 and 1964 Olympics.

Career
At the inaugural Pan American Games in 1951, in Buenos Aires, Argentina, he finished 6th in the 200-metre breaststroke. At the 1952 Summer Olympics in Helsinki, he swam the 200-metre breaststroke, not reaching the finals. At the 1955 Pan American Games in Mexico City, he won the bronze medal in the Water Polo. At the 1959 Pan American Games in Chicago, he won the bronze medal in the Water Polo. At the 1963 Pan American Games in São Paulo, he won the gold medal in the Water Polo. At Rome 1960 and Tokyo 1964, he finished 13th with the Brazilian Water Polo team.

External links

External links
 

1931 births
2020 deaths
Brazilian male water polo players
Swimmers at the 1951 Pan American Games
Swimmers at the 1952 Summer Olympics
Water polo players at the 1960 Summer Olympics
Water polo players at the 1964 Summer Olympics
Olympic swimmers of Brazil
Olympic water polo players of Brazil
Pan American Games gold medalists for Brazil
Pan American Games bronze medalists for Brazil
Brazilian male breaststroke swimmers
Pan American Games medalists in water polo
Medalists at the 1955 Pan American Games
Medalists at the 1959 Pan American Games
Medalists at the 1963 Pan American Games
Sportspeople from Florianópolis